The Middlesex Board of Education is a comprehensive community public school district that serves students in pre-kindergarten through twelfth grade from Middlesex Borough, in Middlesex County, New Jersey, United States. The district includes three elementary schools, a middle school and a high school.

As of the 2020–21 school year, the district, comprised of five schools, had an enrollment of 2,018 students and 182.2 classroom teachers (on an FTE basis), for a student–teacher ratio of 11.1:1.

The district is classified by the New Jersey Department of Education as being in District Factor Group "FG", the fourth-highest of eight groupings. District Factor Groups organize districts statewide to allow comparison by common socioeconomic characteristics of the local districts. From lowest socioeconomic status to highest, the categories are A, B, CD, DE, FG, GH, I and J.

Schools
Schools in the district (with 2020–21 enrollment data from the National Center for Education Statistics) are:
Elementary schools
Hazelwood Elementary School with 189 students in grades PreK-3
Richard Gianchiglia, Principal
Parker Elementary School with 178 students in grades K-3
Jason Sirna, Principal
Watchung Elementary School with 256 students in grades K-3
Karen Dudley, Principal
Woodland Intermediate School was split off of the middle school starting in 2020-21
Ryan Regan, Principal
Middle school
Von E. Mauger Middle School with 759 students in grades 4-8
Dr. Remi Christofferson, Principal
High school
Middlesex High School with 619 students in grades 9-12
Dana Chibbaro, Principal

Administration
Core members of the district's administration are:
Dr. Roberta Freeman, Superintendent
Bert Arifaj, Board Secretary / Business Administrator

Board of education
The district's board of education is comprised of five members who set policy and oversee the fiscal and educational operation of the district through its administration. As a Type II school district, the board's trustees are elected directly by voters to serve three-year terms of office on a staggered basis, with either one or two seats up for election each year held (since 2012) as part of the November general election. The board appoints a superintendent to oversee the district's day-to-day operations and a business administrator to supervise the business functions of the district.

References

External links
Middlesex Borough Public Schools
 
School Data for the Middlesex Board of Education, National Center for Education Statistics

Middlesex, New Jersey
New Jersey District Factor Group FG
School districts in Middlesex County, New Jersey
District boards of education in the United States